Exocentrus ritae is a species of longhorn beetles of the subfamily Lamiinae. It was described by Sama in 1985, and is endemic to Turkey. The beetles inhabit deciduous trees. They measure  in length, and can live for approximately 1–2 years.

References

Beetles described in 1985
Acanthocinini
Endemic fauna of Turkey